The townsite of Wonnerup is located  south of Perth and  east of Busselton. It was gazetted a townsite in 1856, deriving its name from the nearby Wonnerup Inlet.

The name is Aboriginal, and has been shown on maps of the region since 1839. The meaning of the name is "place of the woman's digging or fighting stick"; the Noongar word for fighting stick is wonna, while the suffix -up denotes place of.  The wonna was made from the peppermint tree, Agonis flexuosa, a coastal native found only in the south-west, and was a common trade item of the Noongar people.

The Wonnerup massacre of Wardandi Noongar people by European settlers occurred in the vicinity of the area in 1841. The Ballaarat Tramline, Western Australia's first railway and railway bridge, was constructed in 1871 in the locality of Lockville, within Wonnerup. Wonnerup was later the junction of the Bunbury to Busselton railway line and the Nannup Branch Railway. In 1998, part of Wonnerup was subsumed into the Busselton suburb of Geographe.

See also
 Wonnerup House

References

External links 

Towns in Western Australia
South West (Western Australia)